Holding the Line: Inside the Nation's Preeminent US Attorney's Office and Its Battle with the Trump Justice Department is a nonfiction book by former Manhattan U.S. Attorney Geoffrey Berman and published by Penguin Press on September 13, 2022..  Berman was fired by former President Trump. In the book, Berman discusses "a range of conflicts he encountered with the [U.S.] Department of Justice during his tenure leading the Southern District of New York." Hence, Berman chronicles the improprieties that were applied by the Trump administration to pressure his U.S. Attorney's office. The author also gives in-depth specifics about cases, which his office prosecuted, such as Michael Cohen; Chris Collins; Michael Avenatti, and Jeffrey Epstein.

References

External links

American non-fiction books
2022 non-fiction books
Books about the Trump administration
Books about legal history
Books about political power
History books about the 21st century
Books about American politicians
Books about New York City
English-language books
Penguin Books books